DNA-dependent protein kinase, catalytic subunit, also known as DNA-PKcs, is an enzyme that in humans is encoded by the gene designated as PRKDC or XRCC7. DNA-PKcs belongs to the phosphatidylinositol 3-kinase-related kinase protein family. The DNA-Pkcs protein is a serine/threonine protein kinase comprising a single polypeptide chain of 4,128 amino acids.

Function 

DNA-PKcs is the catalytic subunit of a nuclear DNA-dependent serine/threonine protein kinase called DNA-PK.  The second component is the autoimmune antigen Ku. On its own, DNA-PKcs is inactive and relies on Ku to direct it to DNA ends and trigger its kinase activity. DNA-PKcs is required for the non-homologous end joining (NHEJ) pathway of DNA repair, which rejoins double-strand breaks.  It is also required for V(D)J recombination, a process that utilizes NHEJ to promote immune system diversity.  DNA-PKcs knockout mice have severe combined immunodeficiency due to their V(D)J recombination defect.

Many proteins have been identified as substrates for the kinase activity of DNA-PK.  Autophosphorylation of DNA-PKcs appears to play a key role in NHEJ and is thought to induce a conformational change that allows end processing enzymes to access the ends of the double-strand break.  DNA-PK also cooperates with ATR and ATM to phosphorylate proteins involved in the DNA damage checkpoint.

Cancer

DNA damage appears to be the primary underlying cause of cancer, and deficiencies in DNA repair genes likely underlie many forms of cancer.  If DNA repair is deficient, DNA damage tends to accumulate. Such excess DNA damage may increase mutations due to error-prone translesion synthesis. Excess DNA damage may also increase epigenetic alterations due to errors during DNA repair. Such mutations and epigenetic alterations may give rise to cancer.

PRKDC (DNA-PKcs) mutations were found in 3 out of 10 of endometriosis-associated ovarian cancers, as well as in the field defects from which they arose. They were also found in 10% of breast and pancreatic cancers.

Reductions in expression of DNA repair genes (usually caused by epigenetic alterations) are very common in cancers, and are ordinarily even more frequent than mutational defects in DNA repair genes in cancers.  DNA-PKcs expression was reduced by 23% to 57% in six cancers as indicated in the table.

It is not clear what causes reduced expression of DNA-PKcs in cancers.  MicroRNA-101 targets DNA-PKcs via binding to the 3'- UTR of DNA-PKcs mRNA and efficiently reduces protein levels of DNA-PKcs.  But miR-101 is more often decreased in cancers, rather than increased.

HMGA2 protein could also have an effect on DNA-PKcs.  HMGA2 delays the release of DNA-PKcs from sites of double-strand breaks, interfering with DNA repair by non-homologous end joining and causing chromosomal aberrations.  The let-7a microRNA normally represses the HMGA2 gene. In normal adult tissues, almost no HMGA2 protein is present. In many cancers, let-7 microRNA is repressed.  As an example, in breast cancers the promoter region controlling let-7a-3/let-7b microRNA is frequently repressed by hypermethylation. Epigenetic reduction or absence of let-7a microRNA allows high expression of the HMGA2 protein and this would lead to defective expression of DNA-PKcs.

DNA-PKcs can be up-regulated by stressful conditions such as in Helicobacter pylori-associated gastritis.  After ionizing radiation DNA-PKcs was increased in the surviving cells of oral squamous cell carcinoma tissues.

The ATM protein is important in homologous recombinational repair (HRR) of DNA double strand breaks. When cancer cells are deficient in ATM the cells are "addicted" to DNA-PKcs, important in the alternative DNA repair pathway for double-strand breaks, non-homologous end joining (NHEJ).  That is, in ATM-mutant cells, an inhibitor of DNA-PKcs causes high levels of apoptotic cell death.  In ATM mutant cells, additional loss of DNA-PKcs leaves the cells without either major pathway (HRR and NHEJ) for repair of DNA double-strand breaks.

Elevated DNA-PKcs expression is found in a large fraction (40% to 90%) of some cancers (the remaining fraction of cancers often has reduced or absent expression of DNA-PKcs).  The elevation of DNA-PKcs is thought to reflect the induction of a compensatory DNA repair capability, due to the genome instability in these cancers.  (As indicated in the article Genome instability, such genome instability may be due to deficiencies in other DNA repair genes present in the cancers.)  Elevated DNA-PKcs is thought to be "beneficial to the tumor cells", though it would be at the expense of the patient.  As indicated in a table listing 12 types of cancer reported in 20 publications, the fraction of cancers with over-expression of DNA-PKcs is often associated with an advanced stage of the cancer and shorter survival time for the patient.  However, the table also indicates that for some cancers, the fraction of cancers with reduced or absent DNA-PKcs is also associated with advanced stage and poor patient survival.

Aging
Non-homologous end joining (NHEJ) is the principal DNA repair process used by mammalian somatic cells to cope with double-strand breaks that continually occur in the genome.  DNA-PKcs is one of the key components of the NHEJ machinery.  DNA-PKcs deficient mice have a shorter lifespan and show an earlier onset of numerous aging related pathologies than corresponding wild-type littermates.  These findings suggest that failure to efficiently repair DNA double-strand breaks results in premature aging, consistent with the DNA damage theory of aging.  (See also Bernstein et al.)

Interactions
DNA-PKcs has been shown to interact with:

 ATM, 
 C1D, and 
 CDC5L, 
 CHEK1, 
 CHUK,
 CIB1, 
 DCLRE1C, 
 ILF2, 
 ILF3, 
 Ku80, 
 NCOA6, 
 P53, 
 RPA2,  and
 WRN.

See also
Non-homologous end joining
V(D)J recombination
Ku
Protein kinase

References

EC 2.7.11